Richard Lawrence Ashton (born 26 September 1963) is an English former cricketer.  Ashton is a right-handed batsman who bowls right-arm medium pace.  He was born at Northampton, Northamptonshire.

Pack made his debut in County Cricket for Lincolnshire by playing a single Minor Counties Championship match for them against Durham in 1988.

In 1991, he joined Bedfordshire, where during that season he played 3 Minor Counties Championship matches against Northumberland, Cumberland and Suffolk.  In his only season with the county, he also played a single List A match against Worcestershire in the 1991 NatWest Trophy.

Eight years later he represented the Northamptonshire Cricket Board, playing 2 List A matches for the Board against Wiltshire in the 1999 NatWest Trophy and Northumberland in the 2000 NatWest Trophy.  In his career total of 3 List A matches, he scored 8 runs at a batting average of 4.00, with a high score of 5*.  In the field he took 2 catches, while with the ball he took a single wicket at a bowling average of 98.00, with best figures of 1/30.

He currently plays club cricket for Northampton Saints Cricket Club in the Northamptonshire Cricket League.

References

External links

1963 births
Living people
Cricketers from Northampton
English cricketers
Lincolnshire cricketers
Bedfordshire cricketers
Northamptonshire Cricket Board cricketers